Mahatma Gandhi School may refer to:
 Mahatma Gandhi International School an IB World School in Ahmedabad, Gujarat, India
 Barasat Mahatma Gandhi Memorial High School in Barasat, West Bengal, India
 Mahatma Gandhi International School, Pasay, Philippines
 Mahatma Gandhi Memorial High School in Fiji
 The Gandhi High School in Pecs, Hungary

See also
 Mahatma Gandhi International School (disambiguation)